Joshua Wilton House, also known as the Shank House and Tau Kappa Epsilon House, is a historic home located at Harrisonburg, Virginia. It was built in 1888, and is a -story, central plan, brick eclectic Late Victorian dwelling.  It has two projecting gabled pavilions and a three-story octagonal turret covered by a pointed roof. The house features elaborate wooden trim and brackets, and a fancy bargeboard decorates the eaves course of the gable roof.

It was listed on the National Register of Historic Places in 1979.

References

Houses on the National Register of Historic Places in Virginia
Victorian architecture in Virginia
Houses completed in 1890
Houses in Harrisonburg, Virginia
National Register of Historic Places in Harrisonburg, Virginia